Saleh Ibrahim Rateb is a Jordanian footballer who plays for Al Khaldiya and the Jordan national football team.

Career 
He played his first match with the Jordan national senior team against South Korea in an international friendly on 14 November 2014, which resulted in a 1–0 loss for Jordan.

International goals

With U-19

With U-23

International career statistics

References

External links
 
 
 

1994 births
Living people
Jordanian footballers
Jordan international footballers
Association football midfielders
Al-Wehdat SC players
2015 AFC Asian Cup players
Jordanian people of Palestinian descent
Sportspeople from Amman
Jordanian expatriate footballers
Jordanian expatriate sportspeople in Kuwait
Expatriate footballers in Kuwait
Al Salmiya SC players
2019 AFC Asian Cup players
Kuwait Premier League players